Tomasz Bednarek and Nikola Mektić were the defending champions but chose not to defend their title.

Jonáš Forejtek and Michael Vrbenský won the title after defeating Evgeny Karlovskiy and Evgenii Tiurnev 6–1, 6–4 in the final.

Seeds

Draw

References

External links
 Main draw

ATP Prague Open - Doubles
2021 Doubles